Usman Khan (10 March 1991 – 29 November 2019), also known as Abu Saif, was a Pakistani-British terrorist who was convicted of plotting a terrorist attack in 2012 and who was shot dead by City of London Police after being restrained by members of the public whilst committing a knife attack near London Bridge on 29 November 2019, during which he killed two people and injured three others.

Early life
Khan was born on 10 March 1991 in Stoke-on-Trent, United Kingdom, to Pakistani immigrant parents. He attended Haywood High School.

Khan spent some part of his teenage years in Pakistan. According to the British Parliament's Independent Reviewer of Terrorism Legislation 2013 report, Khan travelled to the Federally Administered Tribal Areas in Pakistan before his arrest in December 2010.  

Khan dropped out of school and preached for al-Muhajiroun. He became a community organiser, helping to put together a Sharia conference in 2009.

2008 anti-terror raids
Khan's home in Stoke-on-Trent was raided by counter-terrorist police in 2008. Khan was interviewed by the BBC in 2008, when he denied being a terrorist; he issued the same denials to a local paper using a false name.  He was 17 at the time. Following a 20-month investigation, it was determined that there was insufficient evidence to charge him with a crime.

2010 arrest and 2012 terrorism conviction

On return from Pakistan, Khan was one of a group of nine men arrested in 2010 who were the focus of MI5's anti-terror Operation Guava and in 2012 all pleaded guilty to Al-Qaeda-inspired terrorism offences, which included plans to bomb the London Stock Exchange, the Houses of Parliament, the US embassy, two rabbis at two synagogues, the Dean of St Paul's Cathedral, the home of then London Mayor Boris Johnson, build a terrorist training camp in land Khan's family owns in Pakistan-administered Kashmir, attending terrorism related operational meetings, preparing to travel abroad, and assisting others in travelling abroad for terrorist activities. Khan, like the others, envisaged returning from their Kashmiri training camp, together with future recruits, to engage in unspecified terror attacks in the UK.

Khan proposed to raise funds in the UK rather than overseas, arguing that supporters in the UK earned in a day what donors in Kashmir earned in a month.  He added: "On Jobseeker's Allowance we can earn that, never mind working for that." His home bugged by MI5, he was recorded calling non-Muslims "dogs." Following his arrest, Khan admitted travelling to the plotter's 2010 tactical meetings in Cardiff in November and in Newport in December. Khan's plans to build a terror-training camp in Kashmir never materialised and "there was no evidence that there was any real funding to build it". The group had formed in October. The terror network's organisational chart was found in Khan's home. In addition to confessing to terrorism planning, Khan admitted terrorism fundraising and possession of the Al Qaeda magazine Inspire.  

Following his arrest, Khan was known as an expert in field craft; his cell was described as having "well developed field craft" in court documents.

Khan received an indeterminate prison sentence in 2012 with a minimum term of eight years. On sentencing, the judge said that Khan and his Stoke-on-Trent associates were "more serious jihadis" who operated "at a higher level of efficacy and commitment than the rest", the other six convicts.

Rehabilitation and release from prison 
Under the indeterminate sentence, Khan was to remain in prison for as long as it was necessary to keep the public safe.  However, Khan's original sentence was quashed.  Along with Nazam Hussain and Mohammed Shahjahan, also from Stoke, Khan appealed against the sentences and the indeterminate sentences were set aside by the Court of Appeal in 2013. The court, headed by Lord Justice Leveson, found the original decision had "wrongly characterised" the three men as more dangerous than the other defendants. Khan's sentence was changed to a 16-year term which allowed him to be automatically released after serving eight years. Khan was released from Belmarsh Prison on standard licence (meaning he was subject to supervision from probation services) in December 2018. Following his release, Stafford Borough Council provided suitable accommodation for Khan, though the Ministry of Justice said "multiple agencies" were involved in his housing.

During his time under custody, Khan completed the Healthy Identity Intervention Programme, which later became the UK's principal rehabilitation scheme for terrorism convicts.  Following Khan's release, he participated in the Desistance and Disengagement Programme, which is designed to "address the root causes of terrorism".

He was considered a "success story" for a Cambridge University rehabilitation programme, and was featured as a case study. Khan had been "befriended and helped" by Cambridge University rehabilitation employees, whom he later murdered.  The Times reported that Cambridge University was considering admitting Khan as an undergraduate.

In April 2020, the CTC Sentinel published a paper over the extent to which fear of recidivism was "overblown". It described Khan and another recent terrorism recidivist as "eye-catching outliers", arguing that less than 5% of terrorists such as Khan attack again.

2019 attack

The terms of Khan's temporary release licence did not allow for travel to London; special permission would have been needed for him to participate in Cambridge University's Learning Together "Five Year Celebration" on the day he carried out the stabbing. Khan sat quietly during the celebration event, attending storytelling and writing workshops; even giving feedback on one. He then stabbed two Learning Together organisers in the chest, killing them, and injured three other people.  He was wearing an electronic tag and a fake suicide jacket when he was shot following the stabbing.

Burial and aftermath
Following his death, Khan's body was taken to a mosque in Birmingham, for a ritual janazah Muslim funerary ceremony. The body was then flown to Islamabad. Khan's burial took place in Kajlani in Kashmir.

"Usman Khan Call 4 Justice" graffiti in support of Khan appeared on multiple walls in his Stoke hometown in the week following his death.

Links to terror group
Khan had previously been connected to Al-Muhajiroun, the group led by Anjem Choudary. He was said to be inspired by Al-Qaeda. Khan's solicitor Vajahat Sharif claimed that Khan had become disillusioned with Al-Muhajiroun and that during his prison sentence he had repeatedly requested the help of a deradicaliser, to no avail. Sharif said that in 2018 Khan appeared to be rehabilitated, and that he may have been "re-groomed" by extremists after his release.

Political and social debate 
In 2012, after being convicted of offences related to a plot to bomb the London Stock Exchange, Khan was sentenced to be kept in prison for an indeterminate time. This meant that he could not be released whilst he was still considered to be a danger to the public. Following an appeal in 2013, his indeterminate sentence was quashed, and in its place he was given a 16-year prison sentence, which meant he would be entitled to automatic release on licence after having served eight years. Questions were also raised about the level of monitoring he was subject to by the authorities responsible after his release. The parole board confirmed that it had no involvement in deciding when Khan was released from prison, saying Khan "appears to have been released automatically on licence" even though he had a "serious long-term plan" and a commitment to terrorism.

Chris Phillips, former head of the UK National Counter Terrorism Security Office, commented the justice system was "playing Russian roulette" with the lives of the public. Phillips commented that the original trial judge "wanted this man in prison for a very very long time", and described Khan's release as "quite incredible". Paul Gibson, former head of counter-terrorism at the UK Ministry of Defence, supported the criticism, commenting on the release: "A lot of people will find that extraordinary."

References

1991 births
2019 deaths
British people of Pakistani descent
British people of Azad Kashmiri descent
British Muslims
British Sunni Muslims
British Islamists
English people of Pakistani descent
English people of Azad Kashmiri descent
English Muslims
English Sunni Muslims
English Islamists
21st-century English criminals
English male criminals
English murderers
Criminals from Staffordshire
Deaths by firearm in London
Male murderers
People convicted on terrorism charges
People shot dead by law enforcement officers in the United Kingdom
People from Stoke-on-Trent
People educated at Haywood Academy